Events from the year 2002 in South Korea.

Incumbents
 President: Kim Dae-jung
 Prime Minister: 
 Lee Han-dong until July 11, 
 Chang Sang (acting) until July 31, 
 Chang Dae-whan (acting) until August 9, 
 Kim Suk-soo

Events 
 January 25: The Korea Independent Commission Against Corruption is established.
 February 21: SBS Plus is launched.
 April 15: Air China Flight 129
 June 13: Yangju highway incident
 June 29: Second Battle of Yeonpyeong
 November 29: 2002 Mnet Asian Music Awards
 December 19: 2002 South Korean presidential election

Sport
 2002 FIFA World Cup co-hosted with Japan
 2002 Asian Games
 2002 K League
 2002 Korean FA Cup
 2002 Korean League Cup
 2002 South Korea national football team season

Films
 List of South Korean films of 2002
 The first edition of the Korean Film Awards

Births
 January 17 — Arredondo Samuel
 January 26 - Isa
 February 5 - Park Jisung
 February 5 - Kang Taehyun
 April 20 - Park Jongseong
 April 26 - Kim Chaehyun
 May 7 – Bang Ye-dam (Treasure)
 August 14 - Huening Kai
 November 11 - Im Yeojin
 November 15 - Sim Jaehyun
 December 8 - Park Sung-hoon (singer)

Deaths

See also
2002 in South Korean music

References

 
2000s in South Korea
Years of the 21st century in South Korea
South Korea
South Korea
South Korea